Teratophilia refers to the sexual attraction to monsters. The word comes from the Greek τέρας, meaning monster, and φιλία, meaning love.

In general 
Teratophilia is classified as a paraphilia. Rather than view the condition as a kink, defenders of teratophilia believe it allows people to see beauty outside of societal standards. Among other things, it has been suggested that monsters can function as an escapist fantasy for some women, since the monster is able to embody masculine attributes without presenting itself as a man, which may embody trauma and terror in extreme cases, or aggravating patriarchal arrangements in the least.

Trends

Tumblr 
The focus is on a wide range of monsters, from the Krampus to Pennywise from the movie It. 

In 2017, the Amphibian Man, the monster from The Shape of Water, became popular. The Amphibian Man is regarded as one of the more gentle monsters. The reaction to the creature has led to attempts by some dildo manufacturers to recreate his genitalia. 

The symbiote from Venom has gained substantial traction after the film's release in 2018. In 2019, the Venom fandom received some media attention after they took a stance against people who are attracted to Ted Bundy. (That is an example of a paraphilia called hybristophilia.) The conflict has gotten so much traction online that even Marvel Comics' Venom writer Donny Cates has weighed in.

Bigfoot 
Monster erotica and Bigfoot erotica have entered the general consciousness after many news outlets, including CNN and BBC, published an article about an incident that happened on Twitter. Virginia Democratic Congressional 2018 candidate Leslie Cockburn tweeted about her opponent Denver Riggleman being a devotee of bigfoot erotica. Cockburn used picture of naked Bigfoot from Riggleman's Instagram as a proof. Riggleman denied all the accusations. Dr. Chuck Tingle, two-time Hugo Award finalist, wrote a story about the incident, entitled Don't Vote for Virginia Congressional Hopeful Denber Wiggleman Because He Is Full of Hate, Not Because Bigfoot Makes Him Hard. Some popular bigfoot erotica titles include Cum for Bigfoot; Boffing Bigfoot; Savage Love; Bigfoot Did Me from Behind and I Liked It; The Butt Files – The Case of Bigfoot's Weiner; and Seduced by Bigfoot and Ravaged by the Yeti: The Secret Adventures of a Fertile Housewife.

Sub- and related categories 

 Stigmatophilia
 Acrotomophilia
 Exophilia

References

External links 
 Pitlane Magazine - http://www.pitlanemagazine.com/cultures/the-vampire-as-a-sex-symbol.html
 Decaturian - https://decaturian.com/views/2018/09/27/venom-symbihot-or-symbinot/
 Psychology Today - https://www.psychologytoday.com/us/blog/unique-everybody-else/201403/monster-porn-and-the-science-sexuality

Sexuality and society
Sexual fetishism
Paraphilias